The Bronc Stomper is a 1928 American silent Western film directed by Leo D. Maloney and starring Eugenia Gilbert, Ben Corbett and Tom London.

Cast
 Eugenia Gilbert as Daisy Hollister
 Don Coleman as Richard Thurston 
 Ben Corbett as Yea Bo Smith 
 Tom London as Alan Riggs 
 Bud Osborne as Slim Garvey 
 Frank Clark as James Hollister 
 Frederick Dana as R.M. Thompson 
 Whitehorse as Town Marshal 
 Ray Walters as Deputy Marshal 
 Bob Burns as Rodeo Manager 
 Florence Lee as Mrs. Hollister

References

External links
 

1928 films
1928 Western (genre) films
American black-and-white films
Films directed by Leo D. Maloney
Pathé Exchange films
Silent American Western (genre) films
1920s English-language films
1920s American films